A list of animated feature films first released in 1996.

Highest-grossing animated films of the year

See also
 List of animated television series of 1996

References

 Feature films
1996
1996-related lists